Sam Ripley Farm is a historic farm near Midway, Georgia in rural Liberty County, Georgia. The structure was built in 1926 and added to the National Register of Historic Places in 2004.

History 
The farm was built in 1926 by Sam Ripley on a portion of his father Harry Ripley's land. The building is typical of subsistence farms of the era. Ripley died in 1988 and the property was sold in 1994. Following some rehabilitation, the property was operated as a bed and breakfast. It was added to the National Register of Historic Places on October 27, 2004.

According to documentation by the NRHP, the building is "representative of the type of African-American subsistence farmsteads developed after the Civil War." The structure is an example of vernacular architecture.

See also 

 National Register of Historic Places listings in Liberty County, Georgia

References

External links 
 

National Register of Historic Places in Liberty County, Georgia
1926 establishments in Georgia (U.S. state)
Farms in Georgia (U.S. state)
Buildings and structures completed in 1926
Vernacular architecture in Georgia (U.S. state)